Jeffrey Brown may refer to:
Jeffrey Brown (cartoonist) (born 1975), American comic book writer and artist
Jeffrey Brown (journalist) (born 1956), American journalist and former news anchor for the PBS Newshour
Jeffrey Brown (politician), former Republican state assemblyman in New York
Jeffrey Brown (professor) (born 1968), American professor at University of Illinois at Urbana-Champaign
Jeffrey D. Brown, American film and television director

See also
Jeff Brown (disambiguation)
Geoffrey Brown (disambiguation)